John Campbell Hamilton-Gordon, 1st Marquess of Aberdeen and Temair,  (3 August 1847 – 7 March 1934), known as The 7th Earl of Aberdeen from 1870 to 1916, was a British politician. Born in Edinburgh, Lord Aberdeen held office in several countries, serving twice as Lord Lieutenant of Ireland (1886; 1905–1915) and serving from 1893 to 1898 as Governor General of Canada.

Early and personal life
Lord Aberdeen was born in Edinburgh to George Hamilton-Gordon, 5th Earl of Aberdeen, and his wife, Mary Baillie, daughter of George Baillie and sister to The 10th Earl of Haddington. He studied at the University of St Andrews and University College, Oxford. He succeeded as The 7th Earl of Aberdeen following the death of his eldest brother, George, 6th Earl of Aberdeen, in January 1870.

In 1877 he married Ishbel Maria Marjoribanks (1857–1939), daughter to Sir Dudley Marjoribanks, 1st Bt., M.P. (later created, in 1880, The 1st Baron Tweedmouth), and Isabella Weir-Hogg. They had been long-time friends.

Lady Aberdeen later served as President of the International Council of Women from 1893 to 1899 and founded the National Council of Women of Canada and the Victorian Order of Nurses.

They had five children:

 George Gordon, 2nd Marquess of Aberdeen and Temair (1879–1965), succeeded father
 Marjorie Adeline Gordon (1880–1970), married John Sinclair, later 1st Lord Pentland
 Dorothea Gordon (March – November 1882)
 Dudley Gladstone Gordon, 3rd Marquess of Aberdeen and Temair (1883–1972), succeeded brother
 Archibald Ian Gordon (1884–1909), was the lover of Lady Desborough

Political life
Lord Aberdeen entered the House of Lords following his succession to his brother's earldom in January 1870. A Liberal, he was present for William Ewart Gladstone's first Midlothian campaign at Lord Rosebery's house in 1879. He became Lord Lieutenant of Aberdeenshire in 1880, served as Lord High Commissioner to the General Assembly of the Church of Scotland from 1881 to 1885 (he held the position again in 1915), and was briefly appointed Lord Lieutenant of Ireland in 1886. He became a Privy Counsellor in the same year. In 1884, he hosted a dinner at Haddo House honouring William Ewart Gladstone on his tour of Scotland. The occasion was captured by the painter Alfred Edward Emslie; the painting is now in the collection of the National Portrait Gallery, London, given by the Marquess's daughter, The Baroness Pentland, in 1953.

He was appointed Honorary Colonel of the 1st Aberdeenshire Artillery Volunteers on 14 January 1888 and retained the position with its successors, the 1st Highland Brigade, Royal Field Artillery, until after World War I.

In 1889 he was chosen as an alderman of the first Middlesex County Council, his address being given as Dollis Hill House, Kilburn, in that county.

In 1891, he bought the Coldstream Ranch in the northern Okanagan Valley in British Columbia and launched the first commercial orchard operations in that region, which gave birth to an industry and settlement colony as other Britons emigrated to the region because of his prestige and bought into the orcharding lifestyle. The ranch is today part of the municipality of Coldstream, and various placenames in the area commemorate him and his family, such as Aberdeen Lake and Haddo Creek.

He served as Governor General of Canada from 1893 to 1898 during a period of political transition. He travelled extensively throughout the country and is described as having "transformed the role of Governor General from that of the aristocrat representing the King or Queen in Canada to a symbol representing the interests of all citizens".

He was made a Knight Grand Cross of the Order of St Michael and St George in 1895.

He was again appointed Lord Lieutenant of Ireland in 1905, and served until 1915. During his tenure he also served as Lord Rector of the University of St Andrews (1913–1916), was created a Knight Companion of the Order of the Thistle (1906), and was created a Knight Grand Cross of the Royal Victorian Order (1911). Following his retirement, he was created Earl of Haddo, in the County of Aberdeen, and Marquess of Aberdeen and Temair, in the County of Aberdeen, in the County of Meath and in the County of Argyll, in January 1916.

Later life

Aberdeen lived the later stages of his life at the House of Cromar in Tarland, Aberdeenshire, which he had built and where he died in 1934. His son, George, succeeded to the marquessate.

The House of Cromar passed to Sir Alexander MacRobert in 1934 and it was renamed Alastrean House by his widow. It was leased to the RAF Benevolent Fund in 1984.

Jokes Cracked by Lord Aberdeen, a collection of John Hamilton-Gordon's dinner party repartee, was first published in 1929. The "bafflingly unfunny" book, long out of print, gained a cult following in more recent times and was reissued in 2013.

The Rocking Chair Ranche
From 1883 until 1896, he was also an owner of and investor in the Rocking Chair Ranche located in Collingsworth County, Texas, together with his father-in-law, The 1st Baron Tweedmouth, and his brother-in-law Edward Marjoribanks, 2nd Baron Tweedmouth.

Honorific eponyms
Geographic Locations
  Ontario: Aberdeen Avenue, Toronto
  Ontario: Aberdeen Avenue, Hamilton
  Ontario: Aberdeen Avenue, Sarnia
Buildings
  Ontario: Aberdeen Pavilion, Ottawa

Arms

References

Further reading

External links

 
 
 
 

1847 births
1934 deaths
Alumni of the University of St Andrews
Alumni of University College, Oxford
British memoirists
Deputy Lieutenants of Aberdeen
Governors General of Canada
Knights Grand Cross of the Order of St Michael and St George
Knights Grand Cross of the Royal Victorian Order
Knights of the Thistle
Lord-Lieutenants of Aberdeenshire
Lords High Commissioner to the General Assembly of the Church of Scotland
Lords Lieutenant of Ireland
1
Members of the Privy Council of the United Kingdom
Politicians from Edinburgh
Rectors of the University of St Andrews
Members of Middlesex County Council
Peers created by George V